"Whole Lotta Love on the Line" is a song co-written and recorded by American country music artist Aaron Tippin.  It was released in April 1994 as the fourth single from the album Call of the Wild.  The song reached No. 30 on the Billboard Hot Country Singles & Tracks chart.  The song was written by Tippin and Donny Kees.

Other versions
The song was originally recorded by Charley Pride on his 1990 album The Best of Charley Pride, released on Curb Records.

Chart performance

References

1994 singles
1990 songs
Charley Pride songs
Aaron Tippin songs
Songs written by Aaron Tippin
Song recordings produced by Scott Hendricks
RCA Records singles
Songs written by Donny Kees